Drouet is a surname, and may refer to:
 Aristide Drouet (1903–1949), French cyclist
 Arnaud Drouet (born 1973), French short track speed skater
 Francis Elliott Drouet (1907–1982), American botanist and museum curator
 Jean-Baptiste Drouet, Comte d'Erlon, French soldier in the Napoleonic Wars
 Jean-Baptiste Drouet (French revolutionary), French politician at the time of the 1789 Revolution
 Jean-Pierre Drouet (born 1935), French percussionist and composer
 Juliette Drouet, French actress
 Laure Drouet (born 1970), French short track speed skater
 Louis Drouet, 19th-century French classical flautist
 Marie Drouet (1885–1963), French heroine of World War I
 Minou Drouet, French poet, musician and actor
 Robert Drouet, American actor and playwright